This is a complete list of butterfly taxa that occur or have occurred in the wild, within the current boundaries of the State of Israel, the Palestinian territories and the Golan Heights.

Hesperiidae

Lycaenidae

Nymphalidae

Papilionidae

Pieridae

References
Ben-Yehuda, Oz. פרפרי ארץ ישראל (butterflies of Israel).
Benyamini, Dubi (1998). List of Butterflies of Israel, Mt Hermon, Sinai Peninsula and East Jordan. 
Benyamini, Dubi (2002). A Field Guide to The Butterflies of Israel. Revised edition. Israel, Jerusalem: Keter. (Hebrew)

See also

List of moths of Israel

Butterflies
Butterflies
Israel
I
Israel